The Soldier Fuel bar, formerly known as Hooah! bar, is a dairy-based calcium-enriched energy bar created by the United States military in 1996. It was originally provided to military personnel packaged within a field ration, such as the Meal, Ready-to-Eat, Meal Cold Weather, or First Strike Ration.

Origin
The name comes from the word "hooah", an expression of high morale, strength and confidence most commonly used by the United States Army. As the Marine Corps preferred the word "Oohrah!" instead, the bar originally had "HOOAH!" and the US Army seal on one side and "OOH-RAH!" and the US Marine Corps seal on the other; newer wrappers have both logos on the same side. The commercial version features the United States roundel instead.

The original military HOOAH! Bar came in apple-cinnamon, chocolate, raspberry, cran-raspberry, and peanut butter flavors. The smaller First Strike bars (provided in the concentrated First Strike Ration) come in the same flavors, except peanut butter; mocha is used instead.

Commercial availability
In 2004, D'Andrea Brothers LLC licensed "HOOAH!" for commercial sales, and the company started marketing the bar to the public in 2004.  The energy bar is now named "Soldier Fuel" instead of HOOAH!, and provides 270 to 280 calories, 10 grams of protein, 8 or 9 grams of fat and 40 grams to 42 grams of carbohydrates. While "Soldier Fuel" was offered in both chocolate and peanut butter in 2017, as of early 2020, it is offered only in chocolate.

See also

 D-ration
 List of military food topics

References

External links

 Soldier Fuel official website
 Stepping up to the energy bar – Boston Globe
 Army secret unwrapped – Washington Times
 HooAH! Bars Arrive in Military, Commercial Markets

Military food of the United States
Products introduced in 1996
Energy food products